Diamond Bus may refer to:

Diamond East Midlands, bus operator in Burton on Trent, England
Diamond North West, bus operator in the north-west of England
Diamond South East, bus operator in south-east England
Diamond West Midlands, bus operator in the West Midlands region of England